Belmonte Piceno is a comune (municipality) in the Province of Fermo in the Italian region Marche, located about  south of Ancona and about  north of Ascoli Piceno.   

Belmonte Piceno borders the following municipalities: Falerone, Fermo, Grottazzolina, Monsampietro Morico, Montegiorgio, Monteleone di Fermo, Montottone, Servigliano.

References

Cities and towns in the Marche